David Manoyan (born on 5 July 1990) is an Armenian professional football player who plays as a midfielder, for FC Ararat Yerevan and the Armenia national football team.

Early life
David Manoyan was born on 5 July 1990 in Yerevan, Armenian SSR. Manoyan spent some time swimming before he started playing football. He has a little brother, Vahagn Manoyan, who also plays football.

Club career
Manoyan was part of the FC Pyunik youth system. In 2007, he signed a contract with the club and spent a full season in the First League. He later joined the Pyunik first team in 2008. During his time on Pyunik, Manoyan scored three goals and was part of the team when they won the 2008 Armenian Premier League and 2009 Armenian Premier League, as well as the 2009 Armenian Supercup and 2009 Armenian Cup. After the championship, the number of professionals recognized the opening of the season. At the headquarters of the Football Federation of Armenia, a ceremony of awarding the winners at the end of the football season 2009 was hosted. Manoyan was awarded the "Discovery of the Year" and "The most promising footballer" awards. Manoyan built through most of the attacks that result in the most goals. In November 2009, an injury of the knee, which was operated by Germany, at a clinic in Hamburg. In March 2010, talks were held for Manoyan to be transferred to German club VfB Stuttgart. Manoyan later showed interest in Swiss club FC Sion. Manoyan decided to remain with Pyunik for another season, in which Pyunik again won the 2010 Armenian Premier League, as well as the 2010 Armenian Supercup and 2010 Armenian Cup.

In the summer of 2012, along with Pyunik teammate Artak Yedigaryan, he held view in interest of FC Metalurh Donetsk. Yedigaryan's game attracted the coaching staff of Metalurh and Manoyan later decided to play for FC Kuban Krasnodar. On 9 August 2012, Manoyan signed a 3-year contract with Kuban. Manoyan was put on loan to Pyunik on 3 September 2012 for a period of 6 months that same year and later became the captain of Pyunik. He underwent knee surgery in Germany on 10 December 2012 due to an injury and has been sitting out for a while.

On 8 February 2018, Manoyan joined the Armenian Premier League side FC Alashkert after signing a 1.5-year contract. 
On 9 December 2019, Manoyan was released by FC Noah. 

He didn't play for Noah in the last two months, and then signed with Shirak SC in January 2020. On 25 July 2020, Manoyan was sold to Shirak's cooperative club FC Ararat Yerevan. However, Ararat revealed on 25 August 2020 that Manoyan was one out of seven players that would be loaned out to Shirak SC for a few days, to help them with their Europa League qualifying game against FCSB, which Shirak lost. Manoyen then returned to Ararat a few days later.

International career
Manoyan made his debut for the Armenia national football team on 11 February 2009 in a friendly game against Latvia. Manoyan stepped on the field at the 80th minute of the match, replacing Edgar Manucharyan. The match took place in Cyprus and ended with the score 0:0.

Honours

Club
Pyunik Yerevan
Armenian Premier League (2): 2008, 2009, 2010
Armenian Supercup (1): 2009, 2010
Armenian Cup (1): 2009, 2010

Individual
2009 Discovery of the Year
2009 The most promising footballer

Filmography

References

External links

1990 births
Footballers from Yerevan
Living people
Armenian footballers
Association football midfielders
Armenia international footballers
Armenian expatriate footballers
Armenian Premier League players
I liga players
Cypriot First Division players
Macedonian First Football League players
FC Pyunik players
FC Kuban Krasnodar players
Karmiotissa FC players
Nea Salamis Famagusta FC players
Sandecja Nowy Sącz players
FC Alashkert players
FK Rabotnički players
FC Noah players
FC Shirak players
FC Ararat Yerevan players
Armenian expatriate sportspeople in Poland
Armenian expatriate sportspeople in Russia
Armenian expatriate sportspeople in Cyprus
Expatriate footballers in Poland
Expatriate footballers in Russia
Expatriate footballers in North Macedonia
Expatriate footballers in Cyprus